2006–07 Albanian Cup was the fifty-fifth season of Albania's annual cup competition. It began on August 27, 2006 with the First Preliminary Round and ended on May 16, 2007 with the Final match. The winners of the competition qualified for the 2007–08 first qualifying round of the UEFA Europa League. KF Tirana were the defending champions, having won their thirteen Albanian Cup last season. The cup was won by Besa.

The first two rounds were played in one-legged format, then other rounds were played in a two-legged format similar to those of European competitions. If the aggregated score was tied after both games, the team with the higher number of away goals advanced. If the number of away goals was equal in both games, the match was decided by extra time and a penalty shootout, if necessary.

Preliminary Tournament

First Preliminary Round
Games were played on August 27, 2006.

|}

Second Preliminary Round
Games were played on September 10, 2006.

|}

First round
All fourteen teams of the 2005–06 Superliga and First Division entered in this round, along with Second Preliminary Round winners. Games were played on September 20 & September 27, 2006.

|}

Second round
First legs were played on October 25, 2006 and the second legs were played on November 22, 2006.

|}

Quarter-finals
In this round entered the 8 winners from the previous round.

|}

Semi-finals
In this round entered the four winners from the previous round.

|}

Final

References

External links
 Official website 

Cup
2006–07 domestic association football cups
2006-07